There is a community of Thais in India consisting mostly of international students and expatriates from Thailand and people born in India with Thai ancestry.

Distribution
There are currently about 60 Thais living and working in Goa, mostly in Panjim and Margao. Most of them work as spa therapists, beauty salon specialists and chefs in five star hotels such as the Taj Holiday village and Holiday Inn. There are also about 50 to 60 Thais residing in Mumbai.

International students
More than 7,000 Thai students study in various International Schools, Indian Universities and colleges.  Thai students prefer Indian institutions as they provide quality education at low cost. Most of these students came to India to study subjects such as humanities, medicine and engineering.

As for School education, around 2,500 Thai students get admitted to Indian boarding and international schools (IB & Cambridge curriculum) each year. The students from Thailand target mainly schools and colleges in North and South India. In North India they prefer Dehradun and New Delhi and in South India they prefer Kodaikanal & Bangalore for school. There are over 5 Thai restaurants in Bangalore. Bangalore has the largest number over 700 of Thai students studying in various schools.

Notable people
 Wisoot Bunpeng -Thai Footballer

See also
 India–Thailand relations
 Indians in Thailand
 India Thai Business Forum
International Schools in India

References

External links
Indiapantip - Thai community in India

India
Thai
 
India–Thailand relations